In geometry, the Tammes problem is a problem in packing a given number of circles on the surface of a sphere such that the minimum distance between circles is maximized.  It is named after the Dutch botanist Pieter Merkus Lambertus Tammes (the nephew of pioneering botanist Jantina Tammes) who posed the problem in his 1930 doctoral dissertation on the distribution of pores on pollen grains. Mathematicians independent of Tammes began studying circle packing on the sphere in the early 1940s; it was not until twenty years later that the problem became associated with his name.

It can be viewed as a particular special case of the generalized Thomson problem of minimizing the total Coulomb force of electrons in a spherical arrangement. Thus far, solutions have been proven only for small numbers of circles: 3 through 14, and 24. There are conjectured solutions for many other cases, including those in higher dimensions.

See also
 Spherical code
 Kissing number problem
 Cylinder sphere packings

References

Bibliography

 Journal articles

 
 
 
 

 Books

External links
 How to Stay Away from Each Other in a Spherical Universe (PDF).
 Packing and Covering of Congruent Spherical Caps on a Sphere.
 Science of Spherical Arrangements (PPT).
 General discussion of packing points on surfaces, with focus on tori (PDF).

Circle packing
Spherical geometry
Palynology